Josy Melde (born 22 January 1951) is a retired Luxembourgian football striker.

References

1951 births
Living people
Luxembourgian footballers
Jeunesse Esch players
CS Fola Esch players
Association football forwards
Luxembourg international footballers